Świętochłowice is a city with powiat rights in Silesia in southern Poland, near Katowice. It is also the central district of the Upper Silesian Metropolitan Union metropolis, with a population of 2 million, and is located in the Silesian Highlands, on the Rawa River (tributary of the Vistula).

It is situated in the Silesian Voivodeship since its formation in 1999, previously in Katowice Voivodeship, and before then, of the Autonomous Silesian Voivodeship. Świętochłowice is one of the cities of the 2.7 million conurbation – Katowice urban area and within a greater Silesian metropolitan area populated by about 5,294,000 people. The population of the city is 49,762 (2019).

History
Initially, Świętochłowice was divided into two parts: the older Małe Świętochłowice (Little Świętochłowice) and newer Duże Świętochłowice (Big Świętochłowice), which date back to the 12th and 13th centuries, respectively. The oldest known mention of Świętochłowice comes from 1313, while the present-day district of Chropaczów was mentioned in 1295. Both settlements were located within the Duchy of Bytom of fragmented Poland and remained under the rule of the Piast dynasty until 1532, as part of the duchies of Bytom and Opole, before passing to the Kingdom of Bohemia. The village received Magdeburg rights at the turn of the 13th and 14th centuries. Until the end of the 17th century, the village of Świętochłowice was owned by the families of Świętochłowski, Paczyński, Kamieński, Rotter, Skall, Myszkowski and Guznar.

In 1742 the settlement was annexed by Prussia and from 1871 to 1922 it was part of Germany. Both parts of Świętochłowice merged in 1790. In the 19th and first part of the 20th century the area rapidly industrialized (based on the numerous local resources, including coal and zinc), leading to the transformation of the village into an industrial settlement. In the early 20th century numerous Polish organizations were established there. In the 1921 Upper Silesia plebiscite, in Świętochłowice 51.9% voted for Germany, while in Chropaczów 70.0% voted for Poland, and in Lipiny and Piaśniki combined 56.4% voted for Poland. In 1922 all named settlements were integrated with the re-established Polish state. In 1929 Zgoda became part of Świętochłowice as its new district. In 1939 Świętochłowice was granted city rights with effect from January 1, 1940, however, due to outbreak of World War II, the actual implementation of this law did not take place until 1947.

In early September 1939, during the German invasion of Poland which started World War II, Świętochłowice was the site of Polish defense, also by the civilian population. Already on September 3–4, 1939, Wehrmacht and Freikorps troops murdered 10 Poles in Świętochłowice (see Nazi crimes against the Polish nation). Afterwards, the town was occupied by Germany. In 1943, the Germans established the Eintrachthütte concentration camp, a forced labour subcamp of the Auschwitz concentration camp. In early 1945 it was occupied by the Soviets, who established the Zgoda labour camp.

After the war once again restored to Poland. In 1951 its city limits were extended with Chropaczów and Lipiny becoming new districts.

Location

Świętochłowice is situated the middle of a highly populated area of Upper Silesia and is part of the Upper Silesian Metropolitan Union, the largest urban center in Poland and one of the largest in Europe.

Population
Currently (2013) Świętochłowice has about 53,000 inhabitants and is thus the city county with the highest population density in Poland. The population of the entire urban area is about 3.5 million.

Climate and soil
Świętochłowice is situated in Silesian-Krakowian climate-zone. The wettest month is July and the driest February.

Brunate and swamp soils predominate in Świętochłowice.

Districts

Świętochłowice has five administrative subdivisions:
Centrum
Chropaczów
Lipiny

Zgoda

Sights
The , devoted to the history of the Silesian Uprisings (1919–1921), is located in Świętochłowice. In addition, the city has historical industrial architecture, town halls, churches, tenement houses and familoks.

Sport
The most popular sport in Świętochłowice is motorcycle speedway. The Skałka Stadium is located in the Centrum.

Sport clubs
Śląsk Świętochłowice – football, speedway
Naprzód Lipiny – football
Czarni Świętochłowice – football

Sportspeople of Świętochłowice in Olympic Games

1928 – Amsterdam
football – Teodor Peterek
gymnastics – Paweł Galus, Franiciszek Pampuch, Teofil Rost, Franciszek Tajstra
1936 – Berlin
football – Hubert Gad, Ryszard Piec, Teodor Peterek
gymnastics – Klara Sierońska-Kostrzewa
1952 – Helsinki
football – Ewald Cebula
swimming – Gotfryd Gremlowski
1956 – Melbourne
gymnastics – Małgorzata Błaszczyk-Wasilewska
1960 – Rome
football – Roman Lentner
1964 – Tokyo
gymnastics – Gerda Bryłka-Krajciczek, Małgorzata Wilczek-Rogoń
1976 – Montreal
fencing – Barbara Wysoczańska
weightlifting – Leszek Skorupa
1976 – Innsbruck
ice-hockey – Kordian Jajszczok
1980 – Moscow
fencing – Barbara Wysoczańska

Politics
The President of Świętochłowice is Daniel Beger. He was elected in 2018.

Notable people
Ewald Cebula (1917–2004), footballer
Arthur Goldstein (1887–1943), German journalist and communist politician
Krzysztof Hanke (born 1957), actor and satiris
Salomon Morel (1919–2007), commandant of Zgoda labour camp
Teodor Peterek (1910–1969), footballer
Jacob Sonderling (1878–1964), German-American Rabbi
Paweł Waloszek (1938–2018), motorcycle speedway rider

Twin towns – sister cities

Świętochłowice is twinned with:

 Heiloo, Netherlands
 Laa an der Thaya, Austria
 Nový Jičín, Czech Republic
 Rimavská Sobota, Slovakia
 Tai'an, China
 Tiszaújváros, Hungary
 Torez, Ukraine

References

External links

Official web
 Jewish Community in Świętochłowice on Virtual Shtetl
Świętochłowician discussion forum

 
City counties of Poland
Cities and towns in Silesian Voivodeship
Silesian Voivodeship (1920–1939)
Nazi war crimes in Poland